In algebraic topology, the Dold-Thom theorem states that the homotopy groups of the infinite symmetric product of a connected CW complex are the same as its reduced homology groups. The most common version of its proof consists of showing that the composition of the homotopy group functors with the infinite symmetric product defines a reduced homology theory. One of the main tools used in doing so are quasifibrations. The theorem has been generalised in various ways, for example by the Almgren isomorphism theorem.

There are several other theorems constituting relations between homotopy and homology, for example the Hurewicz theorem. Another approach is given by stable homotopy theory. Thanks to the Freudenthal suspension theorem, one can see that the latter actually defines a homology theory. Nevertheless, none of these allow one to directly reduce homology to homotopy. This advantage of the Dold-Thom theorem makes it particularly interesting for algebraic geometry.

The theorem
 Dold-Thom theorem. For a connected CW complex X one has πnSP(X) ≅ H̃n(X), where H̃n denotes reduced homology and SP stands for the infite symmetric product.

It is also very useful that there exists an isomorphism φ : πnSP(X) → H̃n(X) which is compatible with the Hurewicz homomorphism h: πn(X) → H̃n(X), meaning that one has a commutative diagram

where i* is the map induced by the inclusion i: X = SP1(X) → SP(X).

The following example illustrates that the requirement of X being a CW complex cannot be dropped offhand:
Let X = CH ∨ CH be the wedge sum of two copies of the cone over the Hawaiian earring. The common point of the two copies is supposed to be the point 0 ∈ H meeting every circle. On the one hand, H1(X) is an infinite group while H1(CH) is trivial. On the other hand, π1(SP(X)) ≅ π1(SP(CH)) × π1(SP(CH)) holds since φ : SP(X) × SP(Y) → SP(X ∨ Y) defined by φ([x1, ..., xn], [y1, ..., yn]) = ([x1, ..., xn, y1, ..., yn]) is a homeomorphism for compact X and Y.

But this implies that either π1(SP(CH)) ≅ H1(CH) or π1(SP(X)) ≅ H1(X) does not hold.

Sketch of the proof
One wants to show that the family of functors hn = πn ∘ SP defines a homology theory.  Dold and  Thom chose in their initial proof a slight modification of the Eilenberg-Steenrod axioms, namely calling a family of functors (h̃n)n∈N0 from the category of basepointed, connected CW complexes to the category of abelian groups a reduced homology theory if they satisfy
 If f ≃ g: X → Y, then f* = g*: h̃n(X) → h̃n(Y), where ≃ denotes pointed homotopy equivalence.
 There are natural boundary homomorphisms ∂ : h̃n(X/A) → h̃n−1(A) for each pair (X, A) with X and A being connected, yielding an exact sequence    where i: A → X is the inclusion and q: X → X/A is the quotient map.
 h̃n(S1) = 0 for n ≠ 1, where S1 denotes the circle.
 Let (Xλ) be the system of compact subspaces of a pointed space X containing the basepoint. Then (Xλ) is a direct system together with the inclusions. Denote by  respectively  the inclusion if Xλ ⊂ Xμ. h̃n(Xλ) is a direct system as well with the morphisms .

One can show that for a reduced homology theory (h̃n)n∈N0 there is a natural isomorphism h̃n(X) ≅ H̃n(X; G) with G = h̃1(S1).

Clearly, hn is a functor fulfilling property 1 as SP is a homotopy functor. Moreover, the third property is clear since one has SP(S1) ≃ S1. So it only remains to verify the axioms 2 and 4. The crux of this undertaking will be the first point. This is where quasifibrations come into play:

The goal is to prove that the map p*: SP(X) → SP(X/A) induced by the quotient map p: X → X/A is a quasifibration for a CW pair (X, A) consisting of connected complexes. First of all, as every CW complex is homotopy equivalent to a simplicial complex, X and A can be assumed to be simplicial complexes. Furthermore, X will be replaced by the mapping cylinder of the inclusion A → X. This will not change anything as SP is a homotopy functor. It suffices to prove by induction that p* : En → Bn is a quasifibration with Bn = SPn(X/A) and En = p*−1(Bn). For n = 0 this is trivially fulfilled. In the induction step, one decomposes Bn into an open neighbourhood of Bn−1 and Bn − Bn−1 and shows that these two sets are, together with their intersection, distinguished, i.e. that p restricted to each of the preimages of these three sets is a quasifibration. It can be shown that Bn is then already distinguished itself. Therefore, p* is indeed a quasifibration on the whole SP(X) and the long exact sequence of such a one implies that axiom 2 is satisfied as p*−1([e]) ≅ SP(A) holds.

One may wonder whether p* is not even a fibration. However, that turns out not to be the case: Take an arbitrary path xt for t ∈ [0, 1) in X − A approaching some a ∈ A and interpret it as a path in X/A ⊂ SP(X/A). Then any lift of this path to SP(X) is of the form xtαt with αt ∈ A for every t. But this means that its endpoint aα1 is a multiple of a, hence different from the basepoint, so the Homotopy lifting property fails to be fulfilled.

Verifying the fourth axiom can be done quite elementary, in contrast to the previous one.

One should bear in mind that there is a variety of different proofs although this one is seemingly the most popular. For example, proofs have been established via  factorisation homology or simplicial sets. One can also proof the theorem using other notions of a homology theory (the Eilenberg-Steenrod axioms e.g.).

Compatibility with the Hurewicz homomorphism

In order to verify the compatibility with the Hurewicz homomorphism, it suffices to show that the statement holds for X = Sn. This is because one then gets a prism

for each Element [f] ∈ πn(X) represented by a map f: Sn → X. All sides except possibly the one at the bottom commute in this diagram. Therefore, one sees that the whole diagram commutes when considering where 1 ∈ πn(Sn) ≅ Z gets mapped to. However, by using the suspension isomorphisms for homotopy respectively homology groups, the task reduces to showing the assertion for S1. But in this case the inclusion SP1(S1) → SP(S1) is a homotopy equivalence.

Applications

Mayer-Vietoris sequence
One direct consequence of the Dold-Thom theorem is a new way to derive the Mayer-Vietoris sequence. One gets the result by first forming the homotopy pushout square of the inclusions of the intersection A ∩ B of two subspaces A, B ⊂ X into A and B themselves. Then one applies SP to that square and finally π* to the resulting pullback square.

A theorem of Moore
Another application is a new proof of a theorem first stated by Moore. It basically predicates the following:
Theorem. A path-connected, commutative and associative H-space X with a strict identity element has the  weak homotopy type of a generalised Eilenberg-MacLane space.
Note that SP(Y) has this property for every connected CW complex Y and that it therefore has the weak homotopy type of a generalised Eilenberg-MacLane space. The theorem amounts to saying that all k-invariants of a path-connected, commutative and associative H-space with strict unit vanish.

Proof
Let Gn = πn(X). Then there exist maps M(Gn, n) → X inducing an isomorphism on πn if n ≥ 2 and an isomorphism on H1 if n = 1 for a Moore space M(Gn, n). These give a map

if one takes the maps to be basepoint-preserving. Then the special H-space structure of X yields a map

given by summing up the images of the coordinates. But as there are natural homeomorphisms

with Π denoting the weak product, f induces isomorphisms on πn for n ≥ 2. But as π1(X) → π1SP(X) = H1(X) induced by the inclusion X → SP(X) is the Hurewicz homomorphism and as H-spaces have abelian fundamental groups, f also induces isomorphisms on π1. Thanks to the Dold-Thom theorem, each SP(M(Gn, n)) is now an Eilenberg-MacLane space K(Gn, n). This also implies that the natural inclusion of the weak product Πn SP(M(Gn, n)) into the cartesian product is a weak homotopy equivalence. Therefore, X has the weak homotopy type of a generalised Eilenberg-MacLane space.

Algebraic geometry
What distinguishes the Dold-Thom theorem from other alternative foundations of homology like  Cech or Alexander-Spanier cohomology is that it is of particular interest for algebraic geometry since it allows one to reformulate homology only using homotopy. Since applying methods from algebraic topology can be quite insightful in this field, one tries to transfer these to algebraic geometry. This could be achieved for homotopy theory, but for homology theory only in a rather limited way using a formulation via sheaves. So the Dold-Thom theorem yields a foundation of homology having an algebraic analogue.

Notes

References

External Links
 Why the Dold-Thom theorem? on MathOverflow
 The Dold-Thom theorem for infinity categories? on MathOverflow
 Group structure on Eilenberg-MacLane spaces on StackExchange

Theorems in algebraic topology